Teufel may refer to:
 Teufel (surname)
 "Teufel" (song), Megaherz
 Teufel (manufacturer), German audio-equipment company
 Paul Teufel & Cie Photogerätebau, German darkroom-equipment (enlargers) company
 Teufel Nursery in Oregon